Winthrop Smith may refer to
Winthrop H. Smith (1893–1961), American investment banker and businessman
Winthrop H. Smith Jr. (born 1949), American financial executive
Winthrop W. Smith, American physicist